The World Encompassed by Sir Francis Drake is the earliest detailed account of Francis Drake's circumnavigation. It was compiled by Drake's nephew, also named Francis Drake, based on his uncle's journal, the notes of Francis Fletcher, and other sources. It was first published in London in 1628 by Nicholas Bourne.

The book gives an account of life at sea and privateering against Spanish ships and settlements, and provides detailed descriptions of various peoples encountered by the expedition It was also published with newly-produced maps based on the discoveries of the voyage.

References

External links
The World Encompassed by Sir Francis Drake at Internet Archive

1628 books
British travel books
English non-fiction books
English-language books